Douglas Alan Johns (born December 19, 1967), is an American former professional baseball player who was a pitcher from -. He played for the Oakland Athletics and Baltimore Orioles of Major League Baseball (MLB). His mother is Jewish, and his father is Roman Catholic, and he considers himself Catholic.

Johns attended Nova High School and played college baseball for the Virginia Cavaliers before being selected in the 1990 Major League Baseball draft by the Athletics. In the Midwest League in 1991, he threw a no-hitter. He led the Pacific Coast League with a 2.89 earned run average in 1994. He made his Major League debut in 1995 and was elected from the game after nearly hitting John Olerud with a pitch. Johns spent part of the 1997 season in Italy pitching for the Parma Angels but, upon returning to the United States to renew his visa, he was offered a job playing in the Orioles farm system.

References

External links

1967 births
Living people
American expatriate baseball players in Canada
American people of Jewish descent
Arizona League Athletics players
Baltimore Orioles players
Baseball players from South Bend, Indiana
Catholics from Indiana
Edmonton Trappers players
Huntsville Stars players
Madison Muskies players
Major League Baseball pitchers
Oakland Athletics players
Omaha Royals players
Reno Silver Sox players
Rochester Red Wings players
Southern Oregon A's players
Tacoma Tigers players
Virginia Cavaliers baseball players
Nova High School alumni
American expatriate baseball players in Italy
Parma Baseball Club players
Catholics from Florida
Baseball players from Florida